The Long Night of Francisco Sanctis is a 2016 Argentine drama film directed by Francisco Márquez and Andrea Testa. It was screened in the Un Certain Regard section at the 2016 Cannes Film Festival.

Cast
 Rafael Federman
 Valeria Lois
 Laura Paredes
 Romina Pinto
 Marcelo Subiotto
 Diego Velázquez

References

External links
 

2016 films
2016 drama films
Argentine drama films
2010s Spanish-language films
2016 directorial debut films
2010s Argentine films